Brooklyn Nine-Nine is an American police procedural comedy television series that aired on Fox, and later on NBC. The show aired from September 17, 2013, to September 16, 2021, for a total of eight seasons and 153 episodes. Created by Dan Goor and Michael Schur, the premise revolves around seven New York City Police Department (NYPD) detectives who are adjusting to life under their new commanding officer, the serious and stern Captain Raymond Holt (Andre Braugher). Featuring an ensemble cast headed by Braugher and Andy Samberg, the cast also features Stephanie Beatriz, Terry Crews, Melissa Fumero, Joe Lo Truglio, Chelsea Peretti, Dirk Blocker, and Joel McKinnon Miller.

Produced as a single-camera comedy, Fox originally ordered 13 episodes for its first season, eventually expanding it to 22 episodes. Brooklyn Nine-Nine premiered on September 17, 2013. On May 10, 2018, Fox cancelled the series after five seasons; the next day, NBC picked it up for a sixth season which premiered on January 10, 2019. The seventh season premiered in February 2020. The 10-episode eighth and final season premiered on August 12, 2021.

The series has been acclaimed by critics. The first season won the Golden Globe Award for Best Television Series – Musical or Comedy, and on the same night, Samberg won the Golden Globe Award for Best Actor – Television Series Musical or Comedy. Braugher has been nominated four times for the Primetime Emmy Award for Outstanding Supporting Actor in a Comedy Series and has twice won the Critics' Choice Television Award for Best Supporting Actor in a Comedy Series. The series has also received particular praise for its portrayal of serious issues, while retaining a sense of humor. For its portrayal of LGBTQ+ people, the series won the 2018 GLAAD Media Award for Outstanding Comedy Series.

Premise
Set in the fictional 99th Precinct of the New York City Police Department in Brooklyn, Brooklyn Nine-Nine follows a team of detectives headed by the serious and intellectual Captain Raymond Holt, who is assigned as their new commanding officer in the pilot episode. The outside of the precinct is based on the 78th Precinct in Brooklyn, as the 99th Precinct is not real.

Cast and characters

 Andy Samberg as Jacob "Jake" Peralta: Jake is a skilled detective, but often acts immaturely. His favorite film is Die Hard, which he references frequently and even attempts to relive. Jake is unrelenting in his confidence, even in the face of failure, and refuses to take things seriously most of the time. He dates and later marries Amy and they have a son in season 7. He often references his hard upbringing due to his father leaving him as a child.
 Stephanie Beatriz as Rosa Diaz: Rosa is a tough, intimidating detective; most of the 99th precinct is afraid of her. She takes pride in being very private and her colleagues know almost nothing about her, including what she likes or where she lives. She used to do ballet and gymnastics as a child and is skilled with various weapons. She also went to medical school and even has a pilot licence. At the police academy, she was classmates with Jake and the two became friends. In season 4 and 5, she dates fellow detective Adrian Pimento, and she comes out as bisexual later in season 5.
 Terry Crews as Terrence "Terry" Jeffords: Terry is a family man with a wife, Sharon, and twin daughters, Cagney and Lacey, having a third daughter in season 3 on Thanksgiving named Ava. He works out frequently and is very strong, but used to be extremely overweight and still has some issues with food. For the first five seasons, he is a sergeant, being addressed as "Sarge" frequently. In season 6, he passes an exam to become a lieutenant. In the series finale, he became the captain of the Nine-Nine. 
 Melissa Fumero as Amy Santiago: Amy is a neurotic, competitive, 'nerdy' detective who desperately seeks Captain Holt's approval. She obsesses over mistakes and is eager to prove herself worthy. She becomes a sergeant in season 5. She and Jake begin to date in season 3, got married in season 5, and have a son named Mac after the fictional John McClane at the end of season 7.
 Joe Lo Truglio as Charles Boyle: Charles is Jake's best friend who is obsessed with strange and unusual food. He most often partners with Jake, whom he holds in high regard, and tends to over-share personal and intimate information with him. Early in season 1, he has an intense crush on Rosa and often tries to ask her out but fails. After a brief engagement to food author Vivian Ludley, he later begins a relationship with an artist named Genevieve and the two adopt a son named Nikolaj from Latvia at the start of season 4. 
 Chelsea Peretti as Regina "Gina" Linetti (main seasons 1–6; special guest season 8): Gina is Captain Holt's assistant and Jake's childhood friend. She acts cool and disinterested in the people around her, instead focusing almost entirely on her phone and social media. Gina is over-confident to the point of arrogance and holds an unproven amount of respect with her peers. She loves dancing and making fun of Amy. She also has a short-lived sexual relationship with Charles, which she is incredibly ashamed of, though she later goes public with the relationship, without consulting Charles. In season 5, she has a child named Enigma/"Iggy". Gina departs temporarily in the start of season 5 due to Peretti's real-life pregnancy, and for good in season 6 to build an online brand, but she returns in the series finale.
 Andre Braugher as Raymond Jacob Holt: Captain Holt is the captain of the 99th precinct who takes pride in being the NYPD's first African American gay police captain. He is known for his stoic and deadpan demeanor and he frequently criticizes Jake's immature behavior, though he eventually develops a strong, familial relationship with all his detectives, who in turn hold him in high esteem. Both Amy and Jake view him as a father figure. He is married to Kevin Cozner, a professor of classics at Columbia University, and has a Pembroke Welsh Corgi named Cheddar. He is also rivals with Deputy Chief Madeline Wuntch.
 Dirk Blocker as Michael Hitchcock and Joel McKinnon Miller as Norm Scully (recurring season 1, starring seasons 2–5, main season 6–8): Hitchcock and Scully are two aging, accident-prone, lazy, and non-proficient detectives whose careers peaked in the 1980s, though they now focus more on paperwork to avoid active police work and love to eat junk food. Because of this, they are often disregarded by the rest of the precinct, but they are quite skilled when they put their minds to it. Hitchcock is known to be vulgar and creepy, especially towards women, and lives in a van; while Scully is more kindhearted and can sing opera well despite having several types of diabetes.

Production

Development
Writers and producers Michael Schur and Dan Goor, who had known each other since they were students at Harvard University, and had collaborated on the sitcom Parks and Recreation, conceived the idea to set a comedy in a police station, a setting they felt had been insufficiently used in television comedies since Barney Miller. They pitched the idea to production company Universal Television, this was developed 2007-2013 for 6 and half years in a row when it announced In 2007-2013 where Schur had a development deal. Although Universal signed on to produce the series, its parent company's network, NBC, passed on airing it, so the duo sold it to the Fox Broadcasting Company.

Fox placed a 13-episode order for the single-camera ensemble comedy in May 2013. The series was picked up for a full season of 22 episodes in October 2013, and was later chosen to air with the sitcom New Girl in a "special one-hour comedy event" as the Super Bowl XLVIII lead-out programs. It was filmed at CBS Studio Center in Studio City, Los Angeles. The exterior view of the fictional 99th Precinct building was the actual 78th Precinct building in Brooklyn.

Cancellation and renewals
Fox canceled the series after five seasons in May 2018. Negotiations to revive the series for a sixth season began shortly afterwards with TBS and NBC, as well as streaming services Hulu and Netflix. After fans launched a social-media campaign calling for a renewal, Goor announced that NBC had picked up the series for a sixth season comprising 13 episodes 30 hours following the cancellation. In a statement, NBC Entertainment chairman Robert Greenblatt expressed regret for originally passing on the series to Fox and was "thrilled" at its addition to the network. NBC subsequently announced that the series would premiere midseason in the 2018–19 television season. In September, the network ordered an additional five episodes for season six, bringing the order to 18. The sixth season premiered on NBC on January 10, 2019. Peretti, who portrays civilian administrator Gina Linetti, departed as a series regular during the season, but returned for a guest appearance.

In February 2019, NBC renewed the series for a seventh season, followed by an eighth season renewal in November prior to the airing of the seventh. The seventh season premiered on February 6, 2020, and concluded on April 23.

In February 2021, NBC announced that the eighth season of 10 episodes would be the last, and further announced that the eighth-season premiere would be delayed until August 12, 2021. Two episodes aired back-to-back each week for five weeks and the series concluded on September 16, 2021.

Writing
In June 2020, Crews said that the planned direction of the eighth season was being altered in response to the murder of George Floyd, with Goor cancelling four "ready to go" episodes as a result. Samberg also stated that the series would be "striking a balance" between addressing police brutality and maintaining its comedic style. It also incorporated the COVID-19 pandemic during the season. Although initially announced as part of NBC's fall schedule, the eighth-season premiere was pushed back to 2021 due to the pandemic.

Goor called ending the series "a difficult decision, but ultimately, we felt it was the best way to honor the characters, the story, and our viewers", with the cast also expressing sentiments for having been a part of the series.

Episodes

Reception

Critical response

Rotten Tomatoes gave season one a score of 89% based on 57 reviews. The consensus is: "Led by the surprisingly effective pairing of Andy Samberg and Andre Braugher, Brooklyn Nine-Nine is a charming, intelligently written take on the cop show format." For Season 2, it received a score of 100% based on 17 reviews. That season's consensus is: "Brooklyn Nine-Nines winning cast, appealing characters and wacky gags make it good comfort food." Metacritic gives the first season of the show a weighted average rating of 70/100 based on 33 reviews, indicating "generally favorable reviews".

Alyssa Rosenberg of The Washington Post deemed Brooklyn Nine-Nine "one of the funniest, most important shows on TV" and highlighted its "ability to find unpredictable routes into a wide range of issues in contemporary policing." Writing for Vanity Fair, Grace Robertson regarded the series as "a well-made exemplar of [...] the workplace sitcom" that confers "straightforward pleasures". Slates Aisha Harris called the series "a well-crafted fantasy, with hardly any discernible connection to current cultural attitudes about law enforcement" but complimented its "talented" ensemble cast. It was ranked No. 24 in Rolling Stones 50 Best TV Shows of the 2010s list, in which its curator, Alan Sepinwall, praised "the comedic yin and yang" of Samberg and Braugher's characters.

Brooklyn Nine-Nine has received praise for its forthright portrayal of LGBTQ people and the serious issues that affect them while retaining its sense of humor. Portraying Captain Raymond Holt, a lead character, as an openly gay, no-nonsense black man in a same-sex interracial marriage is unprecedented in cinema and television. The coming out as bisexual by detective Rosa Diaz in episode "99", the 99th episode of the series, has been described as an important representation of sexual orientation.

Ratings

Awards and nominations

Broadcast
Brooklyn Nine-Nine is broadcast in Canada on Citytv. After the second episode of the second season, it was replaced on Sunday nights by Rogers Hometown Hockey for the duration of the 2014–15 NHL regular season; after the NHL season concluded City resumed airing Brooklyn Nine-Nine, and has continued to broadcast the show simultaneously with the American broadcast since the third season (Hometown Hockey was moved to Sportsnet in 2015). The series also airs on TBS and sister channel TruTV from 2018 to 2021. On February 7, 2022, Comedy Central was announced to become the new syndication home starting on February 20. In the United Kingdom, the show premiered on E4 in January 2014. The second season debuted on January 15, 2015, the third began on January 7, 2016, and the fourth on January 5, 2017. The fifth season aired on March 8, 2018, the sixth on March 28, 2019, and the seventh on March 26, 2020. The series airs on RTÉ2 in Ireland. In New Zealand, Brooklyn Nine-Nine premiered on TV2 on February 13, 2014.

In South Asia, Brooklyn Nine-Nine airs on Comedy Central India. In South Africa, the series premiered on SABC3, in the 19:00 timeslot, airing Mondays to Fridays, where repeats aired on Sunday In Australia, it premiered on SBS on July 28, 2014, and airs repeats on Universal Channel from January 7, 2015. It moved to SBS 2 in 2015 commencing with the second season, which premiered on March 3, 2015. It has now moved to SBS Viceland, currently airing on Fridays at 8:30pm. In December 2014, Netflix UK added the first season to its listings, with Netflix Australia following suit in March 2015. Since 2016, Netflix UK, Australia, Germany, Austria, Latin America, and Switzerland have carried seasons 1 to 6 of Brooklyn Nine-Nine. The seventh season was added to Netflix UK on March 26, 2021. In South East Asia and Sri Lanka, Brooklyn Nine-Nine airs right after the U.S. on Diva.

French Canadian adaptation
A French Canadian adaptation of the series, titled Escouade 99 (translates to "Squad Ninety-Nine"), debuted on the Québec streaming platform Club Illico in 2020. Set in Quebec City, Escouade 99 has a budget of 4 million for the first season of the series, which is approximately the same budget as a single episode of Brooklyn Nine-Nine. Following the release of the first trailer, Fumero criticized the casting, specifically that of white actresses in the roles based on Amy Santiago and Rosa Diaz. Escouade 99 is also already casting a second season.

Home media

Notes

References

External links

 
 Official website  at Fox
 

 
2013 American television series debuts
2021 American television series endings
2010s American police comedy television series
2010s American single-camera sitcoms
2010s American workplace comedy television series
2010s American LGBT-related comedy television series
2020s American police comedy television series
2020s American single-camera sitcoms
2020s American workplace comedy television series
2020s American LGBT-related comedy television series
American crime comedy television series
American LGBT-related sitcoms
American television series revived after cancellation
Best Musical or Comedy Series Golden Globe winners
Bisexuality-related television series
English-language television shows
Fictional portrayals of the New York City Police Department
Fox Broadcasting Company original programming
NBC original programming
Same-sex marriage in television
Super Bowl lead-out shows
Television series by 3 Arts Entertainment
Television series by Fremulon
Television series by Universal Television
Television series created by Michael Schur
Television shows featuring audio description
Television shows filmed in Los Angeles
Television shows set in Brooklyn